American race may refer to:
In racial anthropology, the native peoples of the (sub-Arctic) Americas considered as one of the major races of mankind, see Amerindian race
The American Race, 1891 book by Daniel Garrison Brinton
In early 20th-century racial ideology of Spain and Latin America, an amalgamated "Iberoamerican race", see La Raza § History

See also
Native peoples of the Americas
Ancestral Native American
Peopling of the Americas
Historical race concepts
Red race 
Johann Friedrich Blumenbach
La Raza Cósmica (1925)
Race and ethnicity in the United States
Race and ethnicity in Latin America